The James Bond series of novels and films has been parodied and referenced many times in a number of different media, including books, comics, films, television shows, and video games. Most notable of all these parodies is the spoof Casino Royale in 1967, which was produced using the actual film rights purchased from writer Ian Fleming over a decade prior to its release. Unlike an imitation, a parody is often protected from legal affairs by the people whose property is being parodied.

Premise

James Bond parodies generally contain several elements, adopted from the James Bond novels and films, which are featured in these parody works. These usually include the following:

 The protagonist(s) is a near invincible, secret service agent, who works for a secret government national or international intelligence agency. In some parodies, the hero is recast as a bumbling idiot, who achieves the given objectives through sheer luck or as a fluke and pre-planning.
 The protagonist is in frequent contact with beautiful, provocative and often scantily clad women during the course of his assignment. Some of these women are dangerous spies working for the other side. Villains accomplices and some women's costumes, whether they are in league with the seen or hidden villain, are evocative and trendy.
 In the original Bond books and films, the chief adversary is usually an evil genius, who heads an international criminal syndicate, which seeks to destroy the current world order, in order to achieve global domination. In the parody, the villain can be a bumbling, over-important, arrogant fool himself.
 Much is made of the use of innovative gadgetry, which the protagonist uses to his advantage.
 The main villain is sometimes completely unseen behind a chair with a menacing voice, smoking, drinking or stroking a cat. 
 Humour is an important component of this genre. Flirtatious and suave tact and flair takes first place. 
 There can be jokes about how stupid or expendable the random anonymous henchman are.
There are also various subgenres, within this style. Some of the most notable variants include: a female protagonist(s) (in place of the male), child protagonists, a strong science fiction element (known as spy-fi) and the erotic (adult) spy novel, comic, or film. The term Eurospy refers to the large number of films within this genre that were produced in Europe. Although many of the James Bond parodies were produced in the United States or Europe, the genre is very much an international one, with novels, comics and films being produced across the globe.

Advertising campaigns
From 1999 to 2006, Guinness promoted its products in Africa using the advertising character, Michael Power (played by Cleveland Mitchell), as the cornerstone of a major marketing campaign. Jo Foster of the BBC referred to Power as "Africa's very own 'James Bond'". The character was portrayed as having been born in Jamaica and raised in Great Britain. By 2003, it became one of the best-known alcohol advertising campaigns in Africa.
In 2002, Guinness applied the Michael Power formula to Asia with the character Adam King.
 In 2012, model Shirley Mallmann appeared in a tribute to the James Bond franchise in celebration of its 50th anniversary for the Brazilian ELLE magazine. She starred in a video directed by Manuel Nogueira titled "Bond Girl Reloaded", where she dons looks from Alexandre Herchcovitch and Balmain, while battling armed villains, ending in a fiery explosion.
 In 2021, MI6 released the image of its annual Christmas Card, which that year featured Father Christmas posing with a candy cane against a backdrop reminiscent of the Bond movies' opening credits.

Comics
 The Dutch comic series Agent 327 by Martin Lodewijk started out as a parody of James Bond, but later evolved more into its own thing, though still maintaining elements from the franchise.
 Anacleto, agente secreto, Spanish comic by Manuel Vázquez Gallego has often been cited as a James Bond parody, but Gallego claimed that his initial inspiration was the TV series Get Smart.
 Asterix and the Black Gold is largely a parody of James Bond, with a Roman secret spy who is a caricature of Sean Connery. 
 The League of Extraordinary Gentlemen: The Black Dossier features a ruthless and sadistic British spy named Jimmy, descended from the League's 19th-century go-between Campion Bond. He reappears in The League of Extraordinary Gentlemen: Century as Sir James, a respected figure in the intelligence community being maliciously kept alive by a vengeful M despite suffering from syphilis, emphysema, and cirrhosis.
 007 -The James Bomb Musical, a Mad Magazine musical based on the James Bond films, where the mysterious head of the evil organisation trying to kill 007 is revealed to be Mike Hammer. The plot was written by Frank Jacobs and drawn by Mort Drucker. It appeared in issue #94 (April 1965).
 In issue #165 (March 1974) of Mad Magazine spoofed eight James Bond movies, again drawn by Mort Drucker, but written by Arnie Kogen.
 In issue #340 (October 1995) of Mad, Mike Snider and Angelo Torres spoofed James Bond by turning it in a politically correct updated version for the 1990s.
 The comic book series Planetary has a secret agent character named John Stone who closely resembles Bond, but has some similarities to Nick Fury
 One issue of the Sonic the Hedgehog Archie comics featured several references to James Bond in a story entitled "The Man from H.E.D.G.E.H.O.G." Among these were: a screen that depicted several of Dr. Robotnik's failed operations, all of which had been thwarted by Sonic the Hedgehog, all named after James Bond movie titles: Moonraker, Dr. No, Thunderball, and Goldfinger; the head of a secret intelligence group known by the alias "Who"; a crate labeled "For Your Eyes Only"; and Sonic making use of one of James Bond's humorous quips "Shocking ... positively shocking".

Films

Unofficial parodies

Matt Helm
First published in 1960, Matt Helm is a fictional character created by author Donald Hamilton. The character is not meant to be a spoof of James Bond, rather having attributes of an homage, but not in the strict sense. Film versions of Matt Helm, as played by Dean Martin, were meant to spoof the 007 movies as well as the character James Bond. The four movies made took their titles from Hamilton's novels, though the movies had little in common with the books of the same name. The Silencers and Murderers' Row were released in 1966. The Ambushers in 1967 and The Wrecking Crew in 1968.

Austin Powers

Austin Powers is a film series created by Canadian comedian Mike Myers. Many of the characters throughout the franchise are parodies of Bond characters, including Myers' character of the same name. Myers has said that Sean Connery was the inspiration for his character, especially Powers' thick chest hair. In addition, the names of the films are also parodies of Bond novels and films.

Films
 International Man of Mystery
 The Spy Who Shagged Me is a parody of The Spy Who Loved Me.
 Goldmember is a parody of Goldfinger. The title of the film led to legal action being taken by MGM, the distributors of the James Bond film franchise, that briefly led to the film's title being removed from promotional material and trailers. During the period when the film had no official title, it was unofficially being called Never Say Member Again, a reference to the non-canon Bond film Never Say Never Again. The dispute was quickly resolved and the original film title remained. Although MGM most likely would have lost a court case against the makers of Goldmember (see: Copyright information on parodies), MGM did secure a spot for the trailer to 2002's Bond film Die Another Day in settlement.

Characters
 Ernst Stavro Blofeld, the head of SPECTRE and Bond's archenemy, is parodied in all three Austin Powers films as Dr. Evil. Like Blofeld, Dr. Evil has a facial scar over his eye and wears either a white or a grey Nehru jacket (which is also worn by the first Bond villain, Dr. No). Both characters also possess white Persian cats. Dr. Evil's cat, however, loses its hair due to a side-effect of the cryogenic freezing process which preserved Dr. Evil for 30 years. Dr. Evil is a parody of Donald Pleasence's Blofeld. 
 Basil Exposition, the head of Powers' organisation is meant to be a combined parody of both M and Q.
 Alotta Fagina is a parody, in name, of the Bond girl Pussy Galore.
 Goldmember, like Auric Goldfinger, also had a passion for gold; he also possessed a golden gun similar to that used by Scaramanga, the villain of The Man with the Golden Gun.
 Colonel Rosa Klebb in the Bond film From Russia with Love and Irma Bunt from On Her Majesty's Secret Service are said to be the prototypes of Frau Farbissina, a top villain in Dr. Evil's organisation.
 Emilio Largo, the SPECTRE villain from Thunderball is parodied in every Austin Powers films as "Number Two".
 Random Task is identical to Goldfinger's henchman, Oddjob, except he throws a shoe instead of a bowler hat.

Daniel Craig cameo in Star Wars
In the movie Star Wars: The Force Awakens by J. J. Abrams, after the main character, Rey, is captured by the First Order, she uses the Force to convince a stormtrooper into setting her free. The actor who played the stormtrooper was Daniel Craig, and the crew of The Force Awakens unofficially dubbed the character "FN-007", in reference to Craig's role as James Bond. Fans adopted this name, as well as "JB-007", for the character. However, the video game Lego Star Wars: The Force Awakens identified the character as FN-1824, which is now considered his official name.

Other Parodies
 Hot Enough for June, a.k.a. Agent  (1964), a British spy comedy with Dirk Bogarde.
 Carry On Spying (1964), British parody with James Bind, Agent  changed to Charlie Bind, Agent 000 (Double 0, oh!) for copyright reasons.
 That Man from Rio (1964), French adventure spoof of Bond-type films.
 Le Tigre aime la chair fraiche (1964), Le Tigre se parfume à la dynamite (1965), and Blue Panther, a.k.a. Marie Chantal contre Dr. (1965), French trilogy directed by Claude Chabrol .
 008: Operation Exterminate (1965), featuring a female 007 type agent. Directed by Umberto Lenzi.
 Agent 077: Mission Bloody Mary and Agent 077 From the Orient with Fury (both 1965), Italian Eurospy adventures starring Ken Clark .
 Two Mafiosi Against Goldfinger (1965). One of many Italian Eurospy films that spoof the James Bond formula. Also known as The Amazing Dr. G.
 Slå først, Frede! aka Strike First Freddy (1965) and its successor Slap af, Frede! aka Relax Freddie (1966) are Danish parodies directed by Erik Balling . Frede Hansen was played by Morten Grunwald .
 Dr. Goldfoot and the Bikini Machine (1965) and Dr. Goldfoot and the Girl Bombs (1966) satirise the James Bond films, particularly Goldfinger.
 The Intelligence Men (1965), broad farce with British comic duo Eric Morecambe and Ernie Wise.
 Licensed to Kill (1965), low budget series featuring Agent Charles Vine, later Charles Bind, is more imitative than satirical.
 Our Man Flint (1966) and In Like Flint (1967), starred James Coburn as Derek Flint, "an intentionally over-the-top parody of Bond". 
 Kiss the Girls and Make Them Die (1966), Italian spoof of the Bond films with Mike Connors 
 The Last of the Secret Agents (1966), Allen & Rossi comedy with Nancy Sinatra 
 Lucky, the Inscrutable, aka Lucky, el intrépido (1966), gag-filled Spanish-Italian comedy from Jesús Franco starring Ray Danton .
 Modesty Blaise (1966), campy British spy-fi film starring Monica Vitti. Although based upon a serious action-adventure comic strip, the film took a camp-comedy approach (similar to that of the Matt Helm films). 
 Secret Agent Super Dragon (1966), Italian Eurospy film starring Ray Danton.
 The Spy with a Cold Nose (1966), British parody of secret agent films.
 Si muore solo una volta (1967), Italian ("You only die once") starring Ray Danton .
 The End of Agent W4C (1967), Czech parody. Superagent W4C has all properties of 007 - artificial gadgets, nice girls, spies everywhere around them.
 Voitheia! O Vengos faneros praktor 000 which can be translated in English: Help! Vengos apparent agent 000 (1967) and a sequel "Thou-Vou falakros praktor, epiheirisis "Yis Mathiam"" which can be translated in English: Thou-Vou bald agent, operation "Havoc" (1969). Thanasis Veggos (Thou-Vou) stars in both.
 OK Connery, 1967, also known as Operation Kid Brother or Operation Double 007. Starring: Neil Connery, Daniela Bianchi, Adolfo Celi, Bernard Lee, Anthony Dawson, Lois Maxwell. When MI6's top agent becomes unavailable, his lookalike younger brother is hired to thwart an evil organisation. Sean Connery's younger brother Neil stars in this Italian film designed to profit from the spy craze. This film features several actors who had appeared in the real Bond series, including Adolfo Celi and Daniela Bianchi. Bernard Lee and Lois Maxwell make cameos reprising their roles as M and Moneypenny (though the character are unnamed)
 A Man Called Dagger (1967). Low budget American spy film. Future Bond villain Richard Kiel (Jaws) co-stars.
 Fathom (1967), Raquel Welch as female Bond-like agent in tongue-in-cheek spy caper.
 Come Spy with Me (1967), American spy film featuring a female agent Andrea Dromm and also starring Troy Donahue.
 Caprice (1967), American comedy-thriller with Doris Day.
 Az oroszlán ugrani készül (1969), (English translation: The Lion Prepares to Jump), a Hungarian comedy spy film starring István Bujtor.
 The Girl from Rio aka Future Woman (1969), campy Spy-fi starring Shirley Eaton (from Goldfinger).
 Zeta One (1969), a British sexploitation Spy-fi with Robin Hawdon as James Word, a womanizing secret agent who investigates James Robertson Justice's criminal mastermind at the behest of 'W' and discovers a race of barely-clad alien superwoman called Angvians. Co-starring Carry On (film series) veteran Charles Hawtrey and Dawn Addams (star of Star Maidens and occasional leading lady in Roger Moore's The Saint) as Zeta.
 Le Magnifique (1973), French comedy starring Jean-Paul Belmondo and Jacqueline Bisset .
 From Hong Kong with Love (1975). Starring: les Charlots, Mickey Rooney, Clifton James, Lois Maxwell, Bernard Lee. French spoof featuring the comedy team les Charlots ("The Crazy boys"). James Bond dies in the James Bond gun barrel sequence. After Queen Elizabeth is kidnapped by a crazed billionaire, Her Majesty's Secret Service replace him with a team of goofy French agents, played by the Crazy Boys. Bernard Lee and Lois Maxwell briefly appear as M and Moneypenny (their characters remaining unnamed). Originally released as Bons baisers de Hong Kong.
 The Dragon Lives Again (1978). Starring:  Alexander Grand . A Hong Kong movie featuring an undead Bruce Lee alongside characters such as Popeye, Dracula, and James Bond. Original title: La Resurrection du Dragon
 S*H*E (1980), an American spy parody film starring Cornelia Sharpe and Omar Sharif, and written by regular Bond screenwriter Richard Maibaum.
 Nati con la camicia, also known as Go for It (1983), an Italian comedy spy action film, starring Terence Hill and Bud Spencer as two strangers accidentally mistaken for CIA operatives. The film features several Bond tropes, including a megalomaniac villain (a spoof of Blofeld, petting a Basset Hound dog instead of a white cat) bent on world domination, employing several henchmen, and the agents using various gadgets to fight them.
 Aces Go Places part III : our man from Bond street, also known as Mad Mission 3, a Hong Kong action comedy featuring a James Bond-like character, as well as various references to the official film series, including appearances by Richard Kiel and an Oddjob-like character.
 Cat City, also known as Macskafogó (1986), a Hungarian-Canadian-German animated comedy action film which heavily spoofs the Bond movies. The main character is an anthropomorphic mouse secret agent named Grabovsky. As another variation of the Blofeld trope, the main villain of the film is a white cat himself.
 Agent 00-7-11 is a parody of James Bond in the film Ninja Academy (1990). In the film 00711 gets his Licence to Kill temporarily revoked.
 If Looks Could Kill aka Teen Agent (1991) directed by William Dear, starring Richard Grieco, Linda Hunt; a mistaken-identity caper.
 From Beijing with Love (1994), with and by Stephen Chow, stars a Chinese 007 wanna-be to search for a stolen dinosaur skull
 Pub Royale (1996), a parody based on the novel of Casino Royale starring Alan Carr
 Spy Hard (1996), starring Leslie Nielsen and Nicollette Sheridan
 Never Say Never Mind: The Swedish Bikini Team (2001) British straight-to-video spoof, featuring a team of beautiful women as the Bondian heroines.
 Undercover Brother (2002)
 Rod Steele 0014: You Only Live Until You Die (2002) Starring Robert Donavan. Lightly pornographic Bond parody based loosely on Milo Manara's comics.
 The Tuxedo (2002). A taxi driver called Jimmy Tong (Jackie Chan) accidentally becomes a spy when he wears a special tuxedo which gives him special skills (martial arts, strength, dancing, singing, sniper skills, etc.).
 Johnny English (2003), a James Bond spoof starring Rowan Atkinson, and its two sequels, Johnny English Reborn (2011) and Johnny English Strikes Again (2018).
 Looney Tunes: Back in Action widely parodies James Bond, with film poster for Licence to Spy, a parody of Licence to Kill, More is Never Enough, parodying either The World Is Not Enough or Never Say Never Again and Codename: Operation Conspiracy. the Mother character simultaneously satirizing M and Q, a car highly similar to an Aston Martin DBS loaded with gadgets (which serves Bugs Bunny a carrot martini Shaken Not Stirred), a penultimate scene that parodies Moonraker, and the film's Damian Drake movies parodying the success of the James Bond films. Drake is even played by former James Bond actor Timothy Dalton. The character Dusty Tails could also be a simultaneous reference to the Bond girl and Shirley Bassey, who sang three of the themes to the James Bond film series.
 The Pink Panther (2006) features a sequence in which Inspector Clouseau meets British Agent 006 (played by a tuxedo-clad, uncredited Clive Owen), to whom Clouseau refers to "one short of the big time". 
 Allkopi Royale (2006), a short Bond Spoof starring Thomas Milligan and Quantum for Allkopi (2008), a Sequel to Allkopi Royale, featuring Norwegian celebrities such as Linni Meister, Helge Hammelow-Berg and Martin Garfalk.
 Epic Movie (2007) - Bond, from Casino Royale (2006 film), makes two short appearances in Gnarnia.
 Meet the Spartans (2008), Le Chiffre appears, torturing Leonidas for the account number in a similar manner to the way he did in Casino Royale. The condition that causes Le Chiffre to weep blood is also parodied, with his tear duct gushing throughout the segment.
 Spycraft: 00Nine (2017), an unofficial independent film project, follows the globe-trotting adventures of the lesser known MI6 agent, 009, and his struggles to dismantle a new criminal organisation acknowledged only as Chimera.
 OSS 117: Cairo, Nest of Spies (2006) and OSS 117: Lost in Rio (2009), two French comedies that parody the original OSS 117 series by Jean Bruce. The first film is set in 1955 and the sequel in 1967. Both movies, which star Jean Dujardin as French secret agent Hubert Bonisseur de La Bath a.k.a. OSS 117, parody and recreate the look and style of espionage films from the 1950s and 1960s.
 Danger Mouse (1981 and 2015) is an animation with a British, gadget-using, flying car-driving secret agent mouse, taking orders from Colonel K (a chinchilla) to counter the dastardly schemes of Baron Silas Greenback (a frog) who pets a fuzzy white caterpillar like Blofeld's Persian cat.
In addition to the above, there have been literally hundreds of films made around the world parodying the spy film genre of the 1960s, if not directly parodying James Bond. One example is the 1966 film Modesty Blaise, which was a parody of the spy genre rather than a faithful adaptation of the (generally serious) comic strip.

Imitative films

Numerous films have attempted to use the James Bond formula; some have used the character of James Bond unofficially.
 G-2 (1965), A Filipino movie starring Tony Ferrer as Tony Falcon:Agent X44, the Filipino James Bond equivalent. G-2 was the first of 16 Agent X44 movies released in the Philippines.
 Kiss Kiss...Bang Bang (1966), Italian Eurospy film with Giuliano Gemma.
 Lightning Bolt aka "Operazione Goldman" (1966) - one of many low-budget Italian Eurospy films.
 One Spy Too Many (1966), feature film release of 2-part TV episode of The Man from U.N.C.L.E..
 Secret Agent Fireball (1966), standard Italian Eurospy film of the period.
 Spy in Your Eye (1966), Italian Spy-fi espionage tale.
 Agent for H.A.R.M. (1966), failed TV pilot released as a feature film.
 Dimension 5 (1966), derivative spy-fi yarn involving time travel.
 The Venetian Affair (1967), capitalises on star Robert Vaughn's image from The Man from U.N.C.L.E. series.
 Hammerhead (1968), Vince Edwards trades in his Ben Casey scrubs for a tuxedo in this campy, imitative James Bond knock-off.
 James Bond 777 (1971), low-budget Indian-made 007 movie with Ghattamaneni Krishna as a pompadoured, moustachioed James Bond.
 Shut Up When You Speak (1981), Aldo Maccione plays Giacomo ("James" in Italian), who dreams that he is James Bond. Original title: Tais Toi Quand Tu Parles.
 Agent 000 and the Deadly Curves (1983), Ilmari Saarelainen plays Joonas G. Breitenfeldt, Agent 000, who attempts to stop the masked villain's organisation (a spoof of SPECTRE). Original title: Agentti 000 ja kuoleman kurvit.
 Our Man From Bond Street (1984), third in the Mad Mission series, also known as Aces Go Places. A Bond look-alike appears, played by Sean Connery's younger brother Neil, as does Oddjob (though not played by Harold Sakata), and Richard Kiel (though not as Jaws).
 The Mahjong Incident (1987), Chinese thriller concerning a priceless jade mahjong piece. James Bond (portrayed by Ron Cohen, an American businessman who just happened to be spotted by the director while on vacation) has a brief cameo. Also known as "The Green Jade Mahjongg."
 Mr. Bond (1992), Indian-made musical, starring Akshay Kumar. As with several other Bond ripoffs, the character is never referred to as "James Bond", remaining simply Mr. Bond throughout the entire movie.
 XXX (2002), borrows heavily from James Bond and includes gadgets and so forth that are similar to some found in a Bond film. Its sequel, XXX: State of the Union, was directed by Lee Tamahori, who had previously directed Die Another Day.

Internet
  Season 5 of the YouTube channel Epic Rap Battles of History features a rap-battle video called "James Bond vs Austin Powers" (released 14 June 2016), which James Bond makes an appearance and is represented by Ben Atha (as the Daniel Craig version) and EpicLLoyd (as the Sean Connery version).
 The gadgetry, titles, characters, product promotion and plots were parodied on the site Michael and Joel at the Movies.
 Greenpeace UK produced an animated parody called Coalfinger (October 2008), featuring the voices of David Mitchell and Brian Blessed.
 During the opening ceremony animated intro sequence of Minecon London 2015, animated by Element Animation for Mojang Studios, a collection of James Bond-inspired British secret agent Minecraft Villagers (voiced by Dan Lloyd) are shown guiding the main character Villager of the short to Minecon.

Music

 Johnny Rivers' song "Secret Agent Man" uses the surf rock style of the James Bond theme. However, although its subject is secret agents and spies, the song was not composed as a reference to Bond but rather as the theme song for American broadcasts of the United Kingdom series Danger Man, which aired in the US under the title Secret Agent.  The song was also covered by Devo on Duty Now For The Future. Its lyrics do, however, refer to the fact the agent described in the song has been assigned a code number (ironically, the lead character of Danger Man/Secret Agent was never actually referred to by a code number).
 British rock band Terrorvision's album Regular Urban Survivors (1996) features sleeve artwork reminiscent of spy movies in general, and Bond in particular. It features a painted cover, depicting the band members in a montage of Bond-like poses.
The Cavaliers Drum and Bugle Corps' 2004 show "007," which placed first at the DCI World Championship Finals, uses musical selections and takes visual design inspiration from the James Bond movies.
 Toy Dolls gives a humorous account of James Bond's off-duty relations to his neighbours in their song "James Bond Lives Down Our Street".
 WAW (Wild Aaron Wilde) released three songs in 2013 on the Total Eclipse label, called "Spy Fool", "Diamonds Are Very Shiny", and "Old Whinger", all in the style of James Bond songs.
 The music video for the Miike Snow song "Genghis Khan" depicts a super villain falling in love with a spy in a tuxedo, who he was going to kill with a deadly laser modeled after the attempt to kill James Bond in Goldfinger.

Novels

Mack Bolan, alias "The Executioner", is a tougher, American James Bond-inspired character created by Don Pendleton, who has featured in over 600 serialized novels with sales, as of 1995, of more than 200 million books, and is the subject of an upcoming film franchise.
 The Book of Bond, or, Every Man His Own 007, sanctioned by Glidrose Productions, is a tongue-in-cheek guide to being a superspy. It was credited to "Lt.-Col. William 'Bill' Tanner" (a literary Fleming character), but was actually written by Kingsley Amis, who would subsequently write the Bond novel, Colonel Sun under another pseudonym, Robert Markham. The book's first hardcover edition had a false slipcover giving the title as The Bible to be Read as Literature (in the novel From Russia, with Love, a fake book with this title hides a gun). The paperback edition was published by Pan Books, formatted the same as its regular James Bond novels.
 Similarly, James Bond's popularity has spurred other writers and book packagers to cash in on the spy craze by launching female-spy alternative versions, such as The Baroness by Paul Kenyon, The Lady From L.U.S.T. spy thrillers by Rod Gray, and Cherry Delight by Glen Chase. The sexy superspy Baroness novels used many Bond references and formulae, such as the title of the second novel Diamonds Are For Dying, culinary and gastronomic descriptive passages, and plot themes.
 Michael K. Frith and Christopher B. Cerf of the Harvard Lampoon wrote Alligator (Book), by "I*n Fl*m*ng" in 1962. Another "J*mes B*nd" story titled "Toadstool" appeared in a Playboy magazine parody published by the Lampoon. Rumour has it this has not been reprinted because of plagiarism issues (some sections are very close to Fleming.) The cover of Alligator parodies the Signet Books paperback covers used for the Fleming novels in the 1960s, including a short Fl*m*ng biography, and a bibliography of nonexistent B*nd novels: Lightningrod, For Tomorrow We Live, The Chigro of the Narcissus, Toadstool, Doctor Popocatapetl, From Berlin, Your Obedient Servant, Monsieur Butterfly, and Scuba Do - Or Die.
 There exists a very short book titled Pussy L'amour and the Three Bears starring James Bear. Although the book James Bond: The Legacy mentions it, one known copy exists.
 Sol Weinstein wrote four novels about Israel Bond, Agent Oy-Oy-Seven, beginning in 1965: Loxfinger; Matzohball; In the Secret Service of His Majesty – the Queen; and You Only Live Until You Die. As with the Harvard Lampoon volumes mentioned above, the covers of the American editions of the Israel Bond books were also based upon the cover designs Signet Books used for Fleming's Bond novels.
 Cyril Connolly wrote the short story "Bond Strikes Camp", satirising a homosexual relationship between M and Bond.
 Between 1965 and 1968, paperback writer William Knoles - sometimes described as "the greatest unknown writer of our time" - penned 20 novels featuring the character Trevor Anderson, codenamed "0008", under the pseudonym Clyde Allison. The series is variously described as "0008" or "The Man From SADISTO," and spoofs both Bond and The Man From U.N.C.L.E. among other icons of espionage. The books were published by adult publisher William Hamling, edited by Earl Kemp and featured seventeen "cover paintings by Robert Bonfils," many also with "hand-lettered titles by Harry Bremner." The series stretches from Our Man From SADISTO (1965) to The Desert Damsels (1968), and also features plots containing spoof characters based on Batman and Modesty Blaise among other heroes.
 Mabel Maney has written two Bond parodies, Kiss the Girls and Make Them Spy and The Girl with the Golden Bouffant. The two parodies are based on the character of Jane Bond, James' lesbian sister, who is called upon to replace her brother when he is incapacitated.
 An Agent 00005 appeared in the science fiction epic The Illuminatus! Trilogy by Robert Shea and Robert Anton Wilson, published in the early 1970s. This character, named Fission Chips, is a somewhat dim-witted Englishman working for British Intelligence, taking orders from a superior named "W." A fan of Ian Fleming's novels, 00005 has patterned his life after James Bond and is obsessed with an organisation known as "B.U.G.G.E.R." (a reference to SPECTRE) which he might have completely fabricated.
 Bridge experts Philip and Robert King wrote a collection of bridge game-related short stories titled Your Deal, Mr. Bond; the title story features 007. (This shouldn't be confused with the official Bond novel, No Deals, Mr. Bond by John Gardner.)
 Kim Newman's novel Dracula Cha Cha Cha features a vampire agent of the Diogenes Club named "Hamish Bond". The segments of the novel featuring this character are filled with references to the James Bond novels and films, including chapters titled "On Her Majesty's Secret Service", "From Bavaria with Love", "Live and Let Die" and "The Living Daylights". Bond's archenemy is a vampiric Blofeld (although there's a twist), and an alteration in his personality, towards the end, portrays the change from Sean Connery to Roger Moore.
 Clive Cussler's novel Night Probe! has its hero Dirk Pitt alternately oppose and work with "Brian Shaw," a retired British Secret Service agent recalled to duty who had taken a pseudonym for protection from his many enemies. The book makes abundantly clear, explicitly so in the two characters' final conversation, that "Shaw" is Bond.
 Bond is parodied as Roger Laser in The Fellowship of the Thing by John Salonia, published by Scarlet Succubus Press in 2001. Laser is shanghaied by an alien scientist to serve as a spy/commando.
 Dr. No Will See You Now is a short piece by English humourist Alan Coren, featuring a geriatric Bond, still-virginal Moneypenny and nonagenarian 'M'.
 Simon R. Green wrote the Secret History book series, which involves a Bond-like investigator of Fantasy and SF criminals, including titles like The Man with the Golden Torc and Daemons Are Forever.

Television

2012 London Summer Olympics
In an advertisement for London's 2012 Olympic bid, Roger Moore and Samantha Bond played Bond and Miss Moneypenny.
Daniel Craig played Bond in a short film, Happy and Glorious, made by the BBC, produced by Lisa Osborne, and directed by Danny Boyle as part of the opening ceremony of the 2012 London Olympics. In the film, Bond is summoned to Buckingham Palace by Queen Elizabeth II—played by herself—and escorts her by helicopter to the Olympic Stadium. Bond and the Queen jump from the helicopter into the stadium with Union Flag parachutes. After the film was shown, the Queen appeared and formally opened the Games.

Television specials and series
Maxwell reprises the role of Moneypenny in Eon Productions' television special Welcome to Japan, Mr. Bond (1967), which was intended to promote You Only Live Twice and contained a storyline of Moneypenny trying to establish the identity of Bond's bride.
The American television series Get Smart (1965–70) features Don Adams as the consummate Bond spoof, Maxwell Smart, a self-assured but incompetent bungler (the character was also inspired by Inspector Clouseau as played by Peter Sellers), who got by on a combination of luck and the help of his savvy female counterpart Agent 99, in an ongoing battle with a quasi-Soviet enemy entity known as KAOS, with use of esoteric and often unreliable or useless gadgets such as his shoe phone. The series later spun off a feature film sequel, The Nude Bomb, a TV-movie, Get Smart Again, and a short-lived mid-1990s TV series revival. It was later adapted as an eponymous 2008 movie. Don Adams also voiced the title character in Inspector Gadget, an animated Get Smart parody television series. Adams also either spoofed or directly reprised the role of Smart in numerous TV commercials.

Television episodes and arcs

American Dad!: "For Black Eyes Only"
The series American Dad! made a parody of "For Your Eyes Only"  The character Stan Smith plays as himself, but he acts like James Bond.  He marries Sexpun T' Come (Francine) after "Tearjerker", but Black Villain (Lewis) kills his wife by accident (he was actually going to kill Stan, but misses and shoots Sexpun instead) One year later, Stan hears that Black Villain will do something evil by melting the Arctic with hair dryers, and his boss tells Stan that Tearjerker (Roger) is still alive.  He then finds Tearjerker in an underground jail and tells him to partner up with Stan.  Tearjerker said that he used to work for Black Villain, but he betrays him.  They then go to a market to find Tearjerker's partner (Klaus as a human), but he was killed by a black mysterious woman.  Stan finds out that the black woman was Sexpun (a clone that Black Villain created, but makes her black) Tearjerker betrays Stan and works for Black Villain again.  Stan tells Sexpun that he is her husband, but she disagrees (Stan gives Sexpun a photo locket of their wedding, but she throws it in a fire).  He brings back her memories by sucking his toes (Sexpun did the same before Black Villain kills her) and teams up with Stan to stop Tearjerker and Black Villain.  Black Villain then starts the hair dryers to melt the Arctic before Stan and Sexpun appear.  The two villains try to stop the two by releasing clones of Tearjerker, but fails (the clones attack each other, then kiss each other before committing suicide).  Then a big wave of water appears, but Stan, Sexpun, and Tearjerker escape while Black Villain was left behind and drowns. While they escape, Sexpun asked why they helped Tearjerker escape and kicks him and is stabbed by a pointed shark.  Stan and Sexpun make out until his boss called him.  He congratulates Stan for his work, even when the half of the world was drowned and sees the two making out.  Meanwhile, Tearjerker survives and was to come out of the shark, but a killer whale appears and grabs the shark's tail and drags the both of them when white letters appears on the top of the screen, saying "To be continued" and "Or was it?".  Saying that it might be Tearjerker's final days.

BoJack Horseman: "Later"
In "Later", a season 1 episode of BoJack Horseman, after publication of his ghost-written memoir, BoJack Horseman is offered a role as the villain of a Bond film titled "007 GOLDHOOF". BoJack's agent Princess Carolyn informs BoJack of the offer, which he declines.

MADtv: "For Your Files Only"
Jane Bond is the name of a fictional spy played by supermodel Claudia Schiffer in the first season of MADtv. In an obvious spoof of James Bond (For Your Eyes Only), Jane Bond went undercover as a temporary office secretary in order to stop an evil corporation (led by Dr. Boss, played by Mary Scheer and her office manager, Part-Time Job, played by Artie Lange) from taking over the world. Instead of having a licence to kill like James Bond, Jane Bond has a licence to collate. Immediately after making her famous introduction, "[My/The name is] Bond, Jane Bond" to Dr. Boss, Bond proceeds to remove the clip that was holding her hair up (and then shaking it out in a prolonged slow motion shot).

Jane Bond's gadgets includes standard office supplies like slingshot-like rubber bands (which she uses during a major office shootout), an extremely sharpened right index fingernail (which she uses to free herself from being tied up in rope), Whack Out (which she uses to subdue Part-Time Job, after initially seducing him), and a stapler (which she uses to defeat Dr. Boss, who had plans on killing Bond via a nitroglycerin filled water cooler). After defeating Dr. Boss, Bond proclaims that she likes her villains "Stapled, not stirred!"

Jane Bond's further adventures include:
"Octotempy" (a parody of Octopussy)
"The Man with the Golden Parachute" (a parody of The Man with the Golden Gun)
"On Her Majesty's Temporary Service" (a parody of On Her Majesty's Secret Service)
"You Only Temp Twice" (a parody of You Only Live Twice)
"Moontemper" (a parody of Moonraker)
"Dr. No-Raise" (a parody of Dr. No)
"Thunder Ball-Point" (a parody of Thunderball)
"The Spy Who Hired Me" (a parody of The Spy Loved Me)
"From Russia with Overtime" (a parody of From Russia with Love)
"The Living Day Jobs" (a parody of The Living Daylights)
"License to Type" (a parody of Licence to Kill)
"Tempfinger" (a parody of Goldfinger)

Sabrina: The Animated Series: "La Femme Sabrina"

In an episode of the 1999 animated adaption of Sabrina the Teenage Witch, "La Femme Sabrina", the video release of Harvey Kinkle's favorite spy film, "On Her Majesty's Expense Account" (a parody of On Her Majesty's Secret Service) was postponed. So Sabrina uses magic to get him a copy of the spy film that he wanted, but backfired the world into an actual spy flick. The episode parodies numerous James Bond references including the gun barrel sequence, Furfinger portrayed by Salem Saberhagen (a parody of Goldfinger), and numerous James Bond film titles including:
"On Her Majesty's Expense Account" (a parody of On Her Majesty's Secret Service)
"From East Bayonne with Love" (a parody of From Russia with Love)
"Dr. Indecisive" (a parody of Dr. No)
"The Spy Who Sorta Had A Crush on Me" (a parody of The Spy Who Loved Me)
"Thundernuggets" (a parody of Thunderball)

SpongeBob SquarePants: "Spy Buddies"
The SpongeBob SquarePants episode "Spy Buddies" has a parody. When SpongeBob is told that Mr. Krabs wants him to spy on Plankton, SpongeBob gets excited and a scene similar to the James Bond gun barrel sequence starts. SpongeBob walks into the circle, only to find that the circle is Patrick looking through a straw.

The Backyardigans: "International Super Spy"

The Backyardigans double-length episode "International Super Spy" portrays Pablo as a parody of James Bond. He wears a tuxedo in the episode and is seen adjusting his bow tie frequently. He goes through the episode trying to recover the 3 Silver Containers before the Lady in Pink (Uniqua) and her henchman (Tyrone) does. Tasha plays the head of the International Super Spy Agency, an obvious parody of M and Austin plays his secret contact throughout the film. Austin may be a parody of Q because he gives Pablo a video phone disguised as a banana split, a cell phone disguised as a hot dog, an astral projection device that is disguised as a snow cone, and finally he gives him a jet pack disguised as a pizza and a pizza-shaped parachute. He also has a car with many different flying attachments (like a jet, helicopter and a glider). Like the real James Bond, Pablo is able to withstand torture when he is subjected to the Lady in Pink's tickle table and he likes his apple juice, "Shaken Not Stirred".

The Office: "Threat Level Midnight"
An episode of The Office, "Threat Level Midnight", is a film made by Michael Scott with him as Michael Scarn, the best secret agent in the business, and Jim Halpert as Goldenface, a spoof of Goldfinger.

The Simpsons: "You Only Move Twice"
An episode of The Simpsons, "You Only Move Twice", features the supervillain, Hank Scorpio. The James Bond analogue, "Mr. Bont", is based on Sean Connery's portrayal but he is captured and killed because Homer Simpson interferes with his attempted escape from captivity.

The final scene at Globex contains references to several James Bond films. The episode title and many references are from You Only Live Twice, with A View to a Kill also being referenced. A character modeled after Sean Connery's Bond is tackled by Homer and killed after a parody of the laser scene from Goldfinger. Mrs. Goodthighs from the 1967 James Bond spoof Casino Royale makes an appearance in the episode and a character based on Norman Schwarzkopf is attacked by Goodthighs. The incident is also a reference to the character Xenia Onatopp, from GoldenEye, who specialises in crushing men between her thighs.

The song at the end of the show, written by Ken Keeler, is a parody of various Bond themes. Keeler originally wrote it to be three seconds longer and sound more like the Goldfinger theme, but the final version was shorter and the lyrics were sped up. The writers wanted the song to be sung by Shirley Bassey, who sang several Bond themes, but they could not get her to record the part.

This is not the only James Bond homage in The Simpsons, however—the "Chief Wiggum P.I." segment of "The Simpsons Spin-Off Showcase" episode borrows heavily from Live and Let Die, even duplicating certain shots. Also, in an alleged "deleted scene" from "$pringfield" from "The Simpsons 138th Episode Spectacular" clip show, Homer, working as a blackjack dealer, causes James Bond to lose to Blofeld, with Oddjob and Jaws as his henchmen, when Homer fails to take out the Joker card and a card for the "Rules for Draw and Stud Poker" out of a playing deck. In addition, an opening couch gag features Homer as Bond in the gun barrel sequence that opens the Bond films. The character Rainier Wolfcastle, an action movie actor, also regularly references Bond. Also, one Halloween episode featured a computer run house with a selection of actor voices. When Bart suggests some 007, Marge asks "George Lazenby?" only to get slightly disappointed when Lisa says "No, Pierce Brosnan."

Adventures of Captain Wrongel 
The Agent 00X is a comic version of Bond, he almost catches criminals in each episode, but at the last moment he fails, which is usually ended by his cruel death. Of course, he will be resurrected at the start of next episode.

Video games

 The Command & Conquer: Red Alert series features a Spy unit for the Allies, depicted in a tuxedo and sounding similar to Sean Connery. In-game he is unarmed, can disguise himself as enemy soldiers, and sneak past any base defence undetected, only vulnerable to attack dogs or psi corps troopers. The Spy unit can infiltrate buildings to shut off power, disable unit production and radar, or steal resources - the second game allows the unit to capture plans for enemy unique units like the Chrono (crazy) Ivan or Psychic Commando, while the third game introduces the ability to bribe enemy units into joining the Spy unit's side.
 The computer game Evil Genius is played from the perspective of a stereotypical 1960s "Bond villain" type of character, as the player builds a trap-filled base, trains minions, hires elite henchmen, and fights off agents from various world intelligence agencies. The most difficult of the agents to defeat is the British agent John Steele, based on Bond.
 In the expansion pack to Grand Theft Auto, Grand Theft Auto: London 1969, there is a car called the 'James Bomb' which looks like an Aston Martin. In the later GTA game, Grand Theft Auto V, Franklin Clinton is made to steal a car from the movie studio where it is being used as a prop in an action film. The car, called the JB 700, bears a strong likeness to the Aston Martin in Goldfinger, and shares a number of hidden features with that car, some usable while others are only referred to, such as two forward-facing machine guns, an ejector seat, a metal shield to protect the rear windscreen and deployable caltrops.
 The James Pond series of games parody Bond movies. Levels in a James Pond game use such titles as A View to a Spill and Leak and Let Die.
 In Metal Gear Solid, on the third playthrough of a saved file, Solid Snake wears a James Bond-style tuxedo.
 In Metal Gear Solid 3: Snake Eater, the character Major Zero is a fan of James Bond as revealed during a codec conversation. The protagonist, Naked Snake, also chides James Bond as not being a real spy, ironically a meta-reference to the many similarities he has with Bond. The title theme, Snake Eater, is also a play on the jazzy pop title tracks from Bond movie, with the lyrics describing nuances in the story and repeating the title multiple times. Also before the title theme the, Virtuous Mission may be considered a play on the pre-title sequences of the Bond series.
 No One Lives Forever (released in 2000) and its sequel, No One Lives Forever 2: A Spy in H.A.R.M.'s Way (2002), by Monolith Productions combine elements of James Bond (including Goldeneye 007 and Perfect Dark), feature a female secret agent, Cate Archer, take place during the 1960s, and are similarly titled to John Gardner's Bond novel, Nobody Lives For Ever. 
 In Operation Flashpoint: Cold War Crisis, a senior US Army Green Beret officer named James Gastovski introduces himself to the game's protagonist 1LT Dave Armstrong in a James Bond-like tone ("Gastovski, James Gastovski").
 Operation Thunderbowel (released in 1988) by Sacred Scroll Software is a text based adventure game featuring Shamus Bond going up against Blobum who is attempting to poison the UN with a powerful laxative.
 In Rayman 3: Hoodlum Havoc, the Wanna Kick Rayman Lesson n°73 features a Hoodmonger Private First Class who dons a tuxedo and holds up a handgun in a characteristic 007 pose, before producing an enormous, laser-firing satellite dish-like device out of his arm.
 One of the trailers for Rayman Raving Rabbids TV Party features a rabbit dressed in a tuxedo singing the James Bond theme in a gun barrel sequence. While singing, he notices the barrel, to which he looks into it and starts singing the rest of the theme into it, only to have a carrot shoot out from the barrel into his mouth.
 Apogee's 1992 series of jump and run games, Secret Agent, is about Agent  tasked with infiltrating the Blofeld-esque hideouts of supervillains directly parodies the James Bond franchise in the setup of its storyline.
 Spy Fox parodies Professor Q, Money Penny, and his villains
 Spy Muppets: License to Croak is a video game featuring Muppet characters directly spoofing James Bond characters, plots and titles.
 Some Stuntman missions require players to race through the streets of Monaco, for the film Live Twice for Tomorrow.
 Team Fortress 2 includes achievements for the Spy character such as "Dr. Nooooo", "For Your Eyes Only", "On Her Majesty's Secret Surface", "The Man with the Broken Guns" and "You Only Shiv Thrice".
 Pokemon Sword and Shield, which takes place in the Britain-inspired Galar region, features the Pokemon species Inteleon, whose characteristic is an amalgamation of secret agents. Additionally, its first evolution form Sobble is numbered "007" in the game’s regional Pokedex.

See also
 Eurospy films
 Outline of James Bond
 Spy film
 Spy-fi (neologism)

Notes and references 
Notes

References

Bibliography

 
 
 
 
 
 

James Bond lists
James Bond parodies